This is a list of members of the Riksdag, elected in the 2018 Swedish general election, for the term 2018–2022.

List of current MPs 
Incumbent MPs, including alternates for serving ministers (listed in cursive) and their current party affiliations, as of 5 February 2022:

List of elected MPs 
Members originally elected in the 2018 general election:

Members who resigned and their successors
Below are listed members who resigned and their subsequent successors.
{| class="wikitable sortable"
! Seat !! class="unsortable" | !! Member of Parliament !! From !! To !! Party !! Constituency !! Successor

Substitutes
Below are substitutes who served for regular members.

{| class="wikitable sortable"
! Seat !! class="unsortable" | !! Member of Parliament !! From !! To !! Party !! Constituency !! Substituting for

References

2018-2022